"Feel" is a song by British singer-songwriter Robbie Williams. It was released on 2 December 2002 as the lead single from his fifth studio album, Escapology (2002). The song became an international hit, peaking at number one in the Czech Republic, Italy, the Netherlands, Portugal, and Romania and reaching the top five in several other countries, including Denmark, Germany, Ireland, Norway, Sweden, and the United Kingdom.

Background
"Feel" was written by Robbie Williams and Guy Chambers. According to Williams, most of the vocals are from the original demo recording from 1999, as he felt unsatisfied with the re-recorded vocals. He commented, "I just couldn't sing it as well as I did on that day."

Chart performance
In the United Kingdom, "Feel" peaked at number four on the UK Singles Chart, spending four weeks inside the top 10. The song topped the charts in Hungary, Italy, Portugal, and the Netherlands. It was also successful in Canada, where it reached the top 10 and spent a total of 20 weeks on the chart. It was the most played song in Europe in 2003. Despite Williams's major success in most of the world, "Feel" failed to reach the US Billboard Hot 100. "Feel" has sold 625,000 copies in the UK as of September 2022.

Music video
The video was directed by Vaughan Arnell and shows Williams in a cowboy-like lifestyle. It gained some attention in the United States thanks to Daryl Hannah's appearance as Williams's love interest. There were two versions of the same video, one shot in black and white and the other in colour and was filmed in Sundre, Alberta, Canada.

Track listings

 UK, Canadian, and Australian CD single
 "Feel" (album version) – 4:22
 "Nobody Someday" (demo version) – 2:53
 "You're History" – 4:44
 Photo gallery and video clips

 UK cassette single
 "Feel" (album version) – 4:22
 "Nobody Someday" (demo version) – 2:53
 "You're History" – 4:44

 UK DVD single
 "Feel" (video) – 4:22
 "You're History" (audio) – 4:44
 "Nobody Someday" (demo version; audio) – 2:53
 3× video clips

 European CD single
 "Feel" (album version) – 4:22
 "Nobody Someday" (demo version) – 2:53

Credits and personnel
Credits are taken from the Escapology album booklet.

Recording
 Recorded in Los Angeles and London
 Mixed at The Record Plant (Los Angeles)
 Mastered at Marcussen Mastering (Los Angeles)

Personnel

 Robbie Williams – writing, lead vocals
 Guy Chambers – writing, bass synthesizer, production, arrangement, orchestral arrangement
 Gary Nuttall – backing vocals, picky guitar
 Zenia Santini – backing vocals
 Anne Skates – directing (gospel choir)
 Fil Eisler – slide guitars
 Neil Taylor – slide guitars
 Phil Spalding – bass
 Andy Wallace – piano
 Dave Clayton – synthesizers
 Jeremy Stacey – drums
 Jony Rockstar – drum loops
 Richard Flack – drum loops, engineering, programming
 London Session Orchestra – orchestra
 Gavyn Wright – concertmaster
 Nick Ingman – orchestral arrangement
 Sally Herbert – orchestral arrangement
 Steve Price – orchestral engineering
 Tom Jenkins – assistant orchestral engineering
 Isobel Griffiths – orchestral contracting
 Jim Brumby – programming, additional engineering
 Steve Power – production, mixing
 J.D. Andrew – assistant mixing
 Steve Marcussen – mastering

Charts

Weekly charts

Year-end charts

Decade-end charts

Certifications

Release history

Cover versions
After the release of "Feel", contestant Ricky Ord sang the song in the second season of Deutschland sucht den Superstar for the theme "My Pop Idol", being one of the first contestants eliminated. In Season 8, contestant Ardian Bujupi sang the song for the theme "English v. German". A year later, in 2016, contestants of the tenth season of X Factor Italy sang a medley of "Feel" and "Angels", before being joined by Williams himself to sing his single "Party Like a Russian".

References

2002 singles
2002 songs
Black-and-white music videos
Chrysalis Records singles
Dutch Top 40 number-one singles
Music videos directed by Vaughan Arnell
Number-one singles in the Czech Republic
Number-one singles in Italy
Number-one singles in Poland
Number-one singles in Portugal
Number-one singles in Romania
Robbie Williams songs
Song recordings produced by Guy Chambers
Song recordings produced by Steve Power
Songs written by Guy Chambers
Songs written by Robbie Williams
Songs about suicide
Songs about depression
Songs about loneliness
Virgin Records singles